Blanioonops is a genus of spiders in the family Oonopidae. It was first described in 1922 by Simon & Fage. , it contains only one species, Blanioonops patellaris, found in East Africa.

Description
The male is unknown. The female has a cephalothorax that is one-and-a-half times as long as wide and weakly convex dorsally. It has no eyes. It is about 1mm long. The cephalothorax, appendages and sternum are tawny. The abdomen is whitish. The dorsal side of the chelicerae are adorned with a series of simple hairs with a row of feathery, thick hairs.

References

Oonopidae
Araneomorphae genera
Spiders of Africa